The Jeffrey’s Bay Wind Energy Facility is a wind farm in the Kouga Local Municipality, built between Jeffrey’s Bay and Humansdorp, in the Eastern Cape province of South Africa.

History
The  site was chosen for its onshore wind conditions, flat topography and proximity to an existing 132 kV grid. A 20-year power purchase agreement was signed with Eskom as well as an implementation agreement with the Department of Energy. The project was authorized by the Department of Environmental Affairs in 2011. Placement of turbines began in September 2013, and was completed by March 2014.

Initial operations started in April 2014. The wind farm supplies 460,000 MWh annually.

References

Kouga Local Municipality
Wind farms in South Africa
Economy of the Eastern Cape